Yalıköy, formerly Podima, is a village in the administrative status of a neighborhood of Çatalca district in Istanbul Province, northwest Turkey. Located at the Black Sea coast, it is a seaside resort with a sand beach. Current mukhtar is Fehmi Kaçar.

Yalıköy was historically a Greek town named Potima. During the population exchange between Greece and Turkey in 1923 that followed the Greco-Turkish War (1919–22), around 60 Turkish families from Greece were settled in the homes of exchanged Greeks. Its population as of 2012 is 2,034.

Yalıköy is a coastal town surrounded on three sides by woods of the Strandzha mountain massif. Its sandy beach attracts tourists. The main economy of the village is forestry and fishing. A local production facility of Şişecam mines silicon as raw material for the glass industry. Another local facility operated by the State Hydraulic Works (DSİ) use Yalıköy sand in water purification. 

Yalıköy is served from Yenibosna in Istanbul by private owned public buses, and from Çatalca by city bus line #404 .

References

External links 
 

Çatalca
Seaside resorts in Turkey
Fishing communities in Turkey
Populated places in Thrace
Former Greek towns in Turkey
Villages in Istanbul Province